Refugee is the only album by teenaged rock band Bad4Good,  released in August 1992 by Interscope Records. The album was produced by Steve Vai. It is currently out of print. The band toured briefly with Damn Yankees before disbanding in 1993.

Reception 

Two months after its release in August, the album hit the Billboard Heatseekers chart, at #39. It was later deemed to be a "flop" by Interscope.

Track listing
 Nineteen (Phil Lynott, Laurence Archer cover) (3:56)
 Curious Intentions (3:49)
 Bangin' Time Again (4:27)
 Mother of Love (3:54)
 Devil in the Angel (4:10)
 Rockin' My Body (4:00)
 Slow and Beautiful (5:22)
 Tyre Kickin' (Ya Makin' Me Nervous) (6:04)
 Terminate (4:23)
 Nothin' Great About A Heartache (4:29)
 We're Gonna Fight (4:10)
 I Want Everything (4:18)
 Felony (3:18)

Personnel

 Danny Cooksey - Lead Vocals
 Thomas McRocklin - Lead Guitar
 Zach Young - Bass Guitar, Backing Vocals
 Brooks Wackerman - Drums
 Michael Bower Background Vocals Tracks 5,7,11,12,13
 Blake Sennett Background Vocals Tracks 5,7,11,12,13

Singles

"Nineteen"

References 

1992 debut albums
Bad4Good albums